Blockade is a monochrome arcade video game developed by Gremlin and released in November 1976. It was the first of what would become known as "snake games". It was designed by Lane Hauck, Ago Kiss, and Bob Pecarero. In Japan, it was distributed by Taito in 1977 as "Barricade II".

Gameplay 
Using four directional buttons, each player moves their character around leaving a solid line behind them, turning at 90 degree angles. To win, a player must last longer than the opponent before hitting something, with the first person to hit something losing. The game ends after one player gains six wins.

Reception 
Blockade was first demonstrated at the AMOA show in November 1976. It was one of the two most talked-about arcade games at the show, along with Namco's electro-mechanical racing game F-1 demonstrated by Atari, Inc. Blockade was possibly the most-played arcade game at the show. Play Meter praised the simplicity of the gameplay.

Legacy 

Several Blockade-style games appeared soon after its release, such as the Bally Astrocade game Checkmate in 1977, Atari's Surround in 1978, and the 1978 TRS-80 computer game Worm.

Though Blockade did not reference snakes or worms, many variants were themed as such, including Nibbler and Snake Byte, both from 1982. The 1997 Nokia mobile phone version is simply called Snake.

Midway's Tron (1982) included a single-player variant of the Blockade concept based on the Light Cycle game from the film.  The player battles against one computer-controlled line-drawing cycle, and three on subsequent levels.  This led to Blockade-style games sometimes being called Tron or light cycles.

References 

1976 video games
Arcade video games
Arcade-only video games
Gremlin Industries games
Puzzle video games
Snake video games
Video games developed in the United States